Woldiya Stadium, officially known as Sheikh Mohammed Hussein Ali al-Amoudi Stadium, is a multi-purpose stadium in Weldiya, Amhara Region, Ethiopia with a capacity of 25,155. It has been the home of Woldia S.C. since its construction in 2017. The stadium is a part of a larger complex housing many other Athletic facilities.

History
The construction of Weldiya Stadium was started in 2010 through the collaboration of local residents and business tycoon Mohammed Al Amoudi. The construction was started with the hope of completion in 5 years. As of 2016, the final touches are being applied.

Inside of the stadium 

With the completion of Weldiya stadium, there is a new hope that Ethiopia will host continental competitions like African Cup of Nations.

Structures and Facilities 
Excluding the main complex, the stadium has adjacent facilities including tennis courts, a basketball court, an Olympic size swimming pool, a volleyball field, a handball court and guest houses.

References

Athletics (track and field) venues in Ethiopia
Football venues in Ethiopia
Multi-purpose stadiums in Ethiopia
Ethiopia
2017 establishments in Ethiopia
Sports venues completed in 2017
21st-century architecture in Ethiopia